The Conservatory of Music, Rangsit University or Wittayalaidontri (literally: College of Music) is the third music school in Thailand, after Duliyangkasilp College, and Khanaduriyangkasart. It was established in 2002 by Arthit Ourairat, President of Rangsit University.

Wittayalaidontri focuses solely on Western music, especially classical, contemporary and popular music. Wittayalaidontri does not offer Thai traditional music courses.

History

Prior to the conservatory, a student in Rangsit University could study music as an optional course at the Institute of Cultural Affairs, with Tanet Sriwong and Suwiwat Thitiwattanarat as their teachers.

The conservatory was established in 2002. Ourairat invited Srikaranonda to act as a temporary dean, while Euprasert, a doctoral student at University of Northern Colorado, had already filled the role.

Initial courses included Composition, Jazz, Performance and Music Production. In 2007, the conservatory began offering classes in music therapy and music business. However, no students enrolled in these courses. In 2009, Boonrut Sirirattanapan offered a course in scoring for film and multimedia.

Ten students each year are awarded the Princess of Naradhiwas scholarship.

Suryadhep Music Hall was completed in 2015. The hall contains 1,300 seats, innovative sound reflection, and a liftable stage for opera performance.

List of deans
 2002-2003:  Dr. 
 2003–2017: Dr. 
 2017–2018: Dr. Wiboon Trakulhun (Acting)
 2018–present: Dr.

Degrees
Pre-College Diploma (In cooperation with Satit Bilingual School of Rangsit University)
Bachelor of Music (B.Mus) degree (Production, Music Engineering Technology, Sound and Media Composition, Contemporary Composition, Songwriting, Instrumental Performance, Piano Performance, Guitar Performance, Voice Performance, Jazz and Contemporary Improvised Music)
Master of Music (M.M) degree (Music Performance and Pedagogy, Composition, Jazz Studies, Music Theory)

Band and activity
Symphony Orchestra
Chorus
Chamber Orchestra
String Quartet
Wind Ensemble
Brass Choir
Percussion Ensemble
Jazz Ensemble
Guitar Ensemble
Opera and Musical Theatre

Service center
Music Academy
Music Production
Artist Management

References 

Rangsit University
Music schools in Thailand
University departments in Thailand
Buildings and structures in Pathum Thani province
Educational institutions established in 2002
2002 establishments in Thailand